Mon Argel Gualvez (born March 10, 1990) is a Filipino broadcast journalist and former student leader. He produces several shows on TV5, News5, 92.3 True FM Radyo5, One PH and One News. He is also the continuity voice over talent of One PH.

Background
Gualvez studied at Holy Trinity Academy in Manila and graduated salutatorian and valedictorian for elementary and high school, respectively. He was a student leader in his college years and graduated AB Communication Magna cum laude from the University of Santo Tomas in 2011, and was also awarded the university's Quezon Leadership Award and Benavides Award. 

In February 2023, famous Filipino comedy page @kblstgn posted a video of Gualvez' report on Twitter where he mentioned "Otin" several times. "Otin" is another Filipino term for penis.

Recognition
Gualvez was awarded Best Field Reporter by the KBP Golden Dove Awards in 2016 for his work in TV5.

Selected shows

References

1990 births
Filipino television news anchors
Living people
University of Santo Tomas alumni
Filipino radio journalists